Conquering Worlds is a 1983 video game published by Datamost.

Gameplay
Conquering Worlds is a game in which the player is the Supreme Commander who takes control of enemy planets in the star system.

Reception
James A. McPherson reviewed the game for Computer Gaming World, and stated that "The scenario for Conquering Worlds is not new, and only slightly different in overall concept from other games. It is similar to Galactic Attack and Titan Empire. If you own either of the two games, you will find Conquering Worlds to be similar."

References

External links
Review in Softalk
1984 Software Encyclopedia from Electronic Games
Review in Electronic Fun with Computers & Games

1983 video games
Apple II games
Apple II-only games
Datamost games
Turn-based strategy video games
Video games developed in the United States
Video games set in outer space